Balbianiales is an order of red algae belonging to the class Florideophyceae. The order consists only one family: Balbianiaceae.

Genera:
 Balbiania  Sirodot, 1876
 Rhododraparnaldia  R.G.Sheath, A.Whittick & K.M.Cole, 1994

References

Florideophyceae
Red algae orders